The 2010–11 VMI Keydets basketball team represented the Virginia Military Institute during the 2010-11 NCAA Division I men's basketball season. The Keydets were coached by Duggar Baucom in his 6th year at VMI, and played their home games at Cameron Hall. It was VMI's 7th season in the Big South Conference, which they have competed in since 2003. VMI finished the year 18–13, 10–8 in the Big South, and lost in the semifinals of the 2011 Big South Conference men's basketball tournament to Coastal Carolina, 89–81. For the fifth straight year, VMI lead the country in points per game and 3-pointers made.

Roster

Schedule

|-
!colspan=9 style=| Regular Season

|-
!colspan=9 style=| Big South tournament

References 

2010-11 team
2010–11 Big South Conference men's basketball season
2010 in sports in Virginia
2011 in sports in Virginia